The 2015–16 season will be Bradford City's 113th season in their history, their 101st in the Football League and 103rd in the English football league system. Along with League One, the club will also compete in the FA Cup, League Cup and Football League Trophy. The season covers the period from 1 July 2015 to 30 June 2016. The new kits were announced in April 2015 – a claret and amber checked home kit, and an all-black away kit.

Pre-Season Friendlies
On 5 June 2015, Bradford City announced their first pre-season friendly against Guiseley. On 10 July 2015, the club confirmed as part of the Scotland tour they will face St Mirren. A day later the Bantams announced they will play host to Carlisle United on 25 July 2015. A pre-season friendly against Burnley was confirmed on 12 June 2015. On 19 June 2015, Bradford City confirmed a friendly against Farsley. On 30 June 2015, the Bantams confirmed their second friendly during the week-long stay in Scotland. On 20 July 2015, Bradford City announced they will send a XI side to Ossett Albion. On 23 July 2015, Bradford announced another friendly addition against Whitby Town.

League One

Matches
On 17 June 2015, the fixtures for the forthcoming season were announced.

League table

Play-offs
After finishing fifth in League One, City were entered into the end-of-season play-offs to determine who would get promoted to Championship for the 2016–17 season. Bradford were against fourth-placed Millwall in the semi-finals and played them over two legs.

FA Cup

League Cup

On 16 June 2015, the first round draw was made, Bradford City were drawn away against York City.

Football League Trophy

On 5 September 2015, the second round draw was shown live on Soccer AM and drawn by Charlie Austin and Ed Skrein. Bradford will host Barnsley.

Squad statistics

Statistics accurate as of 20 May 2016

Transfers

Transfers in

Transfers out

Loans in

Loans out

References

Bradford City A.F.C. seasons
Bradford City